{{DISPLAYTITLE:C7H6O4}}
The molecular formula C7H6O4 may refer to:

 Dihydroxybenzoic acids, a type of phenolic acids
 2,3-Dihydroxybenzoic acid (2-pyrocatechuic acid or hypogallic acid)
 2,4-Dihydroxybenzoic acid (β-resorcylic acid)
 2,5-Dihydroxybenzoic acid (gentisic acid)
 2,6-Dihydroxybenzoic acid (γ-resorcylic acid)
 3,4-Dihydroxybenzoic acid (protocatechuic acid)
 3,5-Dihydroxybenzoic acid (α-resorcylic acid)
 Patulin, a mycotoxin produced by a variety of molds